Bailey Michael Zappe (born April 26, 1999) is an American football quarterback for the New England Patriots of the National Football League (NFL). He played his first three seasons of college football at Houston Baptist and used his last year of eligibility at Western Kentucky, where he set the FBS season records for passing yards and passing touchdowns. Zappe was selected by the Patriots in the fourth round of the 2022 NFL Draft.

Early life and high school
Zappe grew up in Victoria, Texas and attended Victoria East High School. As a senior, he passed for 3,770 yards and 37 touchdowns, while rushing for 633 yards and scoring 15 touchdowns. Zappe was not heavily recruited and committed to play college football at Houston Baptist University, which was his only scholarship offer.

College career

Houston Baptist
Zappe started nine games in his first year for the Huskies at Houston Baptist, passing for 1,548 yards with five touchdowns and 10 interceptions while rushing for two more touchdowns. As a redshirt sophomore, he completed 357-of-560 passes for 3,811 yards with 35 touchdowns and 15 interceptions. As a redshirt junior, he passed for 1,833 yards and 15 touchdowns against one interception in four games in a shortened season after the Southland Conference fall football season was canceled due to the COVID-19 pandemic. Zappe entered the transfer portal after the season.

Western Kentucky
Zappe committed to transfer to Western Kentucky University, following former Houston Baptist offensive coordinator Zach Kittley. Zappe's top wide receiver at Houston Baptist, Jerreth Sterns, also transferred to Western Kentucky. Zappe was named the Hilltoppers' starting quarterback going into the 2021 season. In his first start for Western Kentucky, he passed for 424 yards and seven touchdowns in a 59–21 win over Tennessee-Martin.

During the 2021 regular season, Zappe led the Football Bowl Subdivision (FBS) passing for 5,545 yards and throwing for 56 touchdowns. Before the 2021 Boca Raton Bowl, he had thrown for nearly 1,100 yards more than the second-ranked FBS quarterback (Will Rogers of Mississippi State), and was within striking distance of the FBS records for passing yardage and touchdowns, set by B. J. Symons of Texas Tech in 2003 and Joe Burrow of LSU in 2019, respectively. In the 2021 Boca Raton Bowl against the Appalachian State Mountaineers, he broke both records, finishing the season with 5,967 passing yards and 62 touchdowns.

College Statistics

Professional career

The New England Patriots selected Zappe in the fourth round of the 2022 NFL Draft with the 137th overall pick. He was named the third-string quarterback for the 2022 season behind starter Mac Jones and second-string backup Brian Hoyer.

When an injury rendered Jones inactive for Week 4 against the Green Bay Packers, Zappe was promoted to the second option behind Hoyer, but made his NFL debut the same game after Hoyer was injured during the first quarter. He completed 10 of 15 passes for 99 yards and a touchdown in the 27–24 loss. Zappe was also the first rookie to throw a touchdown pass during the season. He made his starting debut the following week against the Detroit Lions, completing 17 of 21 passes for 188 yards, a touchdown, and an interception in the 29–0 shutout victory. After a Week 6 victory over the Cleveland Browns, during which he threw for 309 yards and two touchdowns, Zappe became the Super Bowl era's first rookie quarterback to win his first two starts and have a passer rating of at least 100 in each. This caused a quarterback controversy between Jones and Zappe on who should be the starting quarterback after Zappe has played well in his first two starts and Jones struggling.

Zappe was named the backup in the Week 7 Monday Night Football matchup with the Chicago Bears due to Jones' return, but relieved a struggling Jones during the second quarter. He threw a touchdown pass on his first drive and led the Patriots to a touchdown on his second, but did not score again and threw two interceptions in the 33–14 defeat. For the following week's game against the New York Jets, Zappe was retained as the team's backup behind Jones for the remainder the season.

NFL career statistics

Regular season

Notes

References

External links
 
 New England Patriots bio
 Western Kentucky Hilltoppers bio
 Houston Baptist Huskies bio

1999 births
Living people
American football quarterbacks
Houston Christian Huskies football players
Western Kentucky Hilltoppers football players
People from Victoria, Texas
Players of American football from Texas
New England Patriots players